The Jaguar R5 was a Formula One racing car used by Jaguar Racing to contest the 2004 Formula One season. The car was driven by Mark Webber and rookie Christian Klien  and its first 2004 Formula One outing was at the Circuit de Catalunya, Barcelona in pre-season testing.

Jaguar used an updated R5B chassis for two races. Klien gave the B spec chassis its debut in China and Webber used it in Brazil. The R5B had originally been taken to the Italian Grand Prix but was not used. Webber drove the RB5 in Japan during Friday practice, but due to the lack of running have to revert to the old car for the race.

History
The car was relatively successful, with Webber scoring four points finishes including a sixth place at Hockenheim. Klien also proved reliable, retiring on only four occasions and managing sixth place at Spa-Francorchamps.

Jaguar finished seventh in their final Constructors' Championship, with 10 points. Jaguar's successor, Red Bull Racing, retained Klien for 2005, while Webber moved to Williams (only to later return to Red Bull).

Livery 
Jaguar unveiled a special Monaco livery to promote the new Ocean's Twelve film. The car's airbox and red-painted nose feature the movie's logo, and the car's nose features a diamond worth $300.000 owned by jewelry brand Steinmetz. Klien crashed into the guardrails at the Loews hairpin on the first lap. When Jaguar personnel arrived at the crash site, the diamond was gone.

Red Bull R5 
When Red Bull bought the Jaguar team in November 2004, they had just a few days to come up with an all new livery in time for their first pre season tests. The livery was light blue and grey and resembled an energy drink can in colour.

BOSS GP
The R5 made a second racing debut in BOSS GP at the 2011 Hockenheim Historic driven by Klaas Zwart coming second in the first race and retiring in the second. The car was later badly damaged in 2017 in a BOSSGP race at Assen TT circuit. This car was repaired and returned to racing in 2019.

Complete Formula One results
(key)

References

Jaguar Formula One cars